Archiphlebia is a genus of moths of the family Tortricidae.

Species
Archiphlebia endophaga (Meyrick, 1911)
Archiphlebia rutilescens (Turner, 1945)

See also
List of Tortricidae genera

References

External links
Tortricid.net

Tortricidae genera
Taxa named by Marianne Horak
Olethreutinae